{
  "type": "FeatureCollection",
  "features": [
    {
      "type": "Feature",
      "properties": {},
      "geometry": {
        "type": "Point",
        "coordinates": [
          68.31831,
          26.458465
        ]
      }
    },
    {
      "type": "Feature",
      "properties": {},
      "geometry": {
        "type": "Polygon",
        "coordinates": [
          [
            [
              68.299942,
              26.439692
            ],
            [
              68.299942,
              26.440616
            ],
            [
              68.300114,
              26.440616
            ],
            [
              68.300114,
              26.439692
            ],
            [
              68.299942,
              26.439692
            ]
          ]
        ]
      }
    }
  ]
}Daur railway station is in Daur city, in the Shaheed Benazir Abad district of Sindh province, Pakistan.

Daur Railway Station Time Table of Pakistan Railways Trains

See also
 List of railway stations in Pakistan

References

External links

Railway stations in Shaheed Benazir Abad District
Railway stations on Karachi–Peshawar Line (ML 1)